The Royal Palace of Riofrío is one of the residences of Spanish royal family. It is under the management of Patrimonio Nacional, a government agency dedicated to the care and maintenance of properties owned by the Spanish state which are used by the royal family. Situated in the municipality of San Ildefonso, in the province of Segovia, central Spain, the building is set in a wooded deer-park.

History
Queen Elisabeth Farnese was widowed in 1746, her husband King Philip V being succeeded by Ferdinand VI, her step-son. As such, to ensure that Elisabeth would remain away from the court, King Ferdinand VI agreed to the construction of a palace at Riofrío for her own disposal. During the reign of her step-son, the queen resided at the Royal Palace of La Granja de San Ildefonso. 

Built in an enclave of the town of San Ildefonso in Segovia, it is some 11 miles from the town that gives its name to the municipality. It is close to the towns of Navas de Riofrío and La Losa. The palace was designed in the Italian style, echoing Elisabeth's birth in the Duchy of Parma, northern Italy. It was designed with a central square and was given three stories high, designed by architect Virgilio Rabaglio, himself Swiss from Gandria near Lugano. Rabaglio was responsible for the exterior decoration Sexmini Pedro, making it one of the most influential Italian palaces of all time. The palace is often likened to its counterpart, the Royal Palace of Madrid, official residence of the Spanish royal family.
 

The dowager queen had wanted her son, then King Carlo VII of Naples to succeed the Spanish throne. However, before the works were completed, King Ferdinand VI died childless in August 1759 and was thus succeeded by King Carlo VII, who was recognised as King Carlos III of Spain. Elisabeth was created regent till her sons arrival in Spain and subsequently resided at the Royal Palace of Aranjuez, dying there in 1766 having never lived at Riofrío. Elisabeth had succeeded in placing four of her children on thrones and intended to give the property to her youngest son, Infante Luis, Count of Chinchón, however he did not use it.

Having been abandoned, it was completed as a hunting lodge and was only used when royalty hunted in the nearby forests. Maria Josepha Amalia of Saxony resided there to avoid the courts disapproval of her childless marriage to King Ferdinand VII. The palace was also used by King Francis, consort of Queen Isabel II to avoid his wife and used later still by King Alfonso XII, who resided there while mourning his beloved wife Queen Maria de las Mercedes. Points of interest within the palace include the patio addition, grand staircase, chapel along with its collection of paintings, tapestries and furniture. It is surrounded by a vast forest of 625 hectares, home to deer among other animals. Today Riofrío is the home of a museum dedicated to the history of hunting.

See also

 List of Baroque residences

References

External links

Further reading
    Royal Palace of Riofrío at the Patrimonio Nacional
  Hunting museum at the Royal Palace of Riofrío
  The Royal Palace of Riofrío at Google Maps

Palaces in Castile and León
Palaces in Spain
Royal residences in Spain
Houses completed in 1752
Baroque palaces
Baroque architecture in Castile and León
Bien de Interés Cultural landmarks in the Province of Segovia
Hunting museums
Museums in Castile and León
Historic house museums in Spain